Rasoolpur Soor is a village in Balrampur district of Uttar Pradesh, India. It is situated on the bank of the Pipra Talab.

References

Villages in Balrampur district, Uttar Pradesh